Elections were held in the Australian state of Queensland between 4 November 1878 and 10 December 1878 to elect the members of the state's Legislative Assembly.

Key dates
Due to problems of distance and communications, it was not possible to hold the elections on a single day.

See also
 Members of the Queensland Legislative Assembly, 1878–1883

References

Elections in Queensland
1878 elections in Australia
1870s in Queensland
November 1878 events
December 1878 events